WROU-FM (92.1 MHz) is an urban adult contemporary radio station licensed to West Carrollton, Ohio serving the Dayton area and owned and operated by Alpha Media. WROU is Dayton's affiliate of The Steve Harvey Morning Show.  Its studios are located in Kettering, Ohio (with a Dayton address) and its transmitter is in west Dayton.

History
WROU was founded by Ro Nita Hawes-Saunders, an educator and dancer who was once an on-air personality at WDAO, in 1991. At the start, it was a typical locally owned Mainstream Urban with live airstaffers until Radio One purchased the station in 2003, after several years of resisting offers to sell the outlet and to fight off bankruptcy. Since the sale of WROU Hawes-Saunders continued to work with the Dayton Contemporary Dance Company as its executive director and serves as a board member of Parents Advancing Choice in Education, Inc. (PACE), which was formed in 1998 to help assist families who seek to exercise education choice for their children while helping schools adopt strategies for improvement. Her life as a radio station owner was also profiled in 2009 in the syndicated television series "Lifestyles with Rebecca."

After Radio One took over the ownership of WROU, it adjusted the format to its current Urban AC presentation due to having WDHT (whose signal and coverage is much larger than WROU) taking the younger demos with its R&B/Hip-Hop heavy Rhythmic product. WROU was briefly known as WRNB after the sale, but reverted to the original calls in 2004. WRNB was originally at 96.9 FM and licensed to Troy as satellite-formatted "Solid Gold Soul" and was at one time the sister station to WROU, which is now Contemporary Christian formatted WYDA "K-LOVE". The WRNB calls are now used for Radio One's Urban AC FM station in Philadelphia.

On May 17, 2007 Philadelphia-based Main Line Broadcasting announced the acquisition of Radio One's stations in the Dayton and Louisville market areas. Main Line took over the Dayton stations on September 14, 2007. In 2014 Main Line would be acquired by Alpha Media, thus becoming the new owners of WROU and its sister stations in the Dayton cluster.

Previous notable on-air staff
Stan "The Man" Boston (Dir. of Programming)
Marco Simmons (Programmer)
Ebony Foxx
Bob Summers
Lee Stephens (a.k.a. The Famous)
L.A. Rene
Ready Action (Music Director)
Indigo Blue
D.J. SKNO
"The Professor" Chris Taylor
Theo Smith
Doug Davis (Double D)

References

External links
WROU 92.1

Urban adult contemporary radio stations in the United States
ROU-FM
Radio stations established in 1991
Alpha Media radio stations